Vasantha Poornima is a 1993 Indian Kannada-language film, directed by H. R. Bhargava and produced by S. A. Srinivas. The film stars Ambareesh, Priyanka, Balaraj and Anand. The film has musical score by Shankar–Ganesh.

Cast

Ambareesh
Priyanka
Balaraj
Anand
K. S. Ashwath
Ramesh Bhat
Shani Mahadevappa
Naveen
Nadig
Master Vijayaraghavendra
Sushma
Pandari Bai
Shobha Raghavendra
Sriraksha
Srimathi Rao
Rama Aravind
Honnavalli Krishna
Devaraj

Soundtrack
The music was composed by Shankar–Ganesh.

References

External links
 
 

1993 films
1990s Kannada-language films
Films scored by Shankar–Ganesh
Films directed by H. R. Bhargava